The River of Stars is a 1921 British silent adventure film directed by Floyd Martin Thornton and starring Teddy Arundell, Harry Agar Lyons and Faith Bevan. It was based on the 1913 novel The River of Stars by Edgar Wallace featuring Commissioner Sanders.

Cast
 Teddy Arundell as Augustus Lambaire 
 Harry Agar Lyons as Commissioner Sanders 
 Faith Bevan as Cynthia Sutton 
 Philip Anthony as John Amber 
 Dalton Somers as Cornelius J. Whitney 
 Fred Thatcher as Frances Sutton 
 J. Edwards Barker as Insp. Fells 
 Ronald Power as Mr. Sutton

References

Bibliography
 Low, Rachael. History of the British Film, 1918-1929. George Allen & Unwin, 1971.

External links

1921 films
1921 adventure films
British adventure films
British silent feature films
1920s English-language films
Films based on works by Edgar Wallace
Films directed by Floyd Martin Thornton
Films set in Africa
British black-and-white films
1920s British films
Silent adventure films